The following is the solo discography of English rock musician John Entwistle.

Studio albums

Live albums

Compilation albums

Singles

Rock music discographies
Discographies of British artists
Discography